United Nations Security Council resolution 663, adopted unanimously on 14 August 1990, after examining the application of the Principality of Liechtenstein for membership in the United Nations, the Council recommended to the General Assembly that Liechtenstein be admitted.

See also
 Member states of the United Nations
 List of United Nations Security Council Resolutions 601 to 700 (1987–1991)

References
Text of the Resolution at undocs.org

External links
 

 0663
 0663
 0663
August 1990 events
1990 in Liechtenstein